Francis Patrick Loftus (March 10, 1898 – October 27, 1980) was a pitcher in Major League Baseball. He played for the Washington Senators in 1926.

References

External links

1898 births
1980 deaths
Major League Baseball pitchers
Washington Senators (1901–1960) players
Baseball players from Pennsylvania
Sportspeople from Scranton, Pennsylvania
Hanover Raiders players
St. Bonaventure Bonnies baseball players